Qaleh-ye Rob-e Bandbal (also Romanized as Qal‘eh-ye Rob‘-e Bandbāl; also known as Qal‘eh-ye Rob‘-e ‘Aţţār) is a village in Shamsabad Rural District, in the Central District of Dezful County, Khuzestan Province, Iran. At the 2006 census, its population was 466, in 99 families.

References 

Populated places in Dezful County